is a Japanese manga series written and illustrated by Seiman Douman. It was serialized in Akita Shoten's Young Champion Retsu magazine from October 2006 to March 2015 and published in three volumes.

Publication
Written and illustrated by Seiman Douman, the series began serialization in Akita Shoten's Young Champion Retsu magazine on October 17, 2006. It completed its serialization on March 17, 2015. The series' individual chapters were collected into three tankōbon volumes.

In September 2017, Seven Seas Entertainment announced that they licensed the series for English publication.

Volume list

Reception
Rebecca Silverman of Anime News Network praised the characters and setting, though she noted the series "often feels too deliberately weird". Silverman also praised Seven Seas Entertainment's allusion to the Eagles' 1977 song "Hotel California" on the back of the book. A columnist for Manga News praised the use of horror and comedy in the story. He also compared it to the works of Kōji Kumeta and Tim Burton.

See also
How Many Light-Years to Babylon?, another manga series by the same author
Nickelodeon, another manga series by the same author

References

External links
 

Akita Shoten manga
Comedy anime and manga
Horror anime and manga
Seinen manga
Seven Seas Entertainment titles
Supernatural anime and manga